Tuoba Fu (pinyin: Tuòbá Fú) (died 294), chieftain of the Tuoba (293–294). 
He was the son of Tuoba Shamohan (拓跋沙漠汗) and the brother of Tuoba Yituo and Tuoba Yilu. In 293, he succeeded Tuoba Chuo as the chieftain of the Tuoba. His predecessor was his father's younger brother. Upon his death in 294, he was succeeded by Tuoba Luguan, another one of his uncles.

His son Tuoba Yulü would also become the chieftain in future.

References 
 History of the Northern Dynasties

294 deaths
Year of birth unknown
Chieftains of the Tuoba clan